"Run for Your Life" is the second single from the Fray's third album Scars & Stories. The music video was released on March 11, 2012.

Meaning 
Singer Isaac Slade and guitarist Joe King penned this song in a remote studio in Leipers Fork, just outside Nashville. Slade told the story of the song to Denver Westword: "This one came from thin air... We started with this idea of twins, two sisters, one makes it one doesn't. We really wrote it about the one that is left, the survivor, who's sort of wracked with guilt, like 'Why me?' We kind of put it in contrast to this African concept of Sankofa. It's basically this concept of: If your village burns down, go back to it and pick through the ashes and find anything good and then take it with you and leave and never look back. It's like an acknowledgment of tragedy and hardship, alongside celebration, almost, and thankfulness for what you have. Kind of run as fast as you can from that black hole of guilt."

Music video 
The video begins with several people, including the band members, looking at the ground and dirt as if something was there before. All of them are alone in their respective places. Some of them begin to run through their empty surroundings. Some of them simply look up, as if gaining hope. The runners soon meet with the others, and they all begin to run behind the band members as the sun sets.

Charts

References

2012 singles
The Fray songs
Epic Records singles
Song recordings produced by Brendan O'Brien (record producer)
Songs written by Isaac Slade
2011 songs
Songs written by Joe King (guitarist)